Jingzhen Octagonal Pavilion is a pavilion located in Jingzhen Village, Mengzhe Township, Menghai County, Xishuangbanna Dai Autonomous Prefecture, Yunnan Province It is 15.42 meters high and 8.6 meters wide, and consists of three parts, the seat, the body, and the top.

History
Jingzhen Octagonal Pavilion was built in 1701 to quell an angry horde of wasps. After the completion of the pavilion, it was destroyed several times. In 1978, it was carefully repaired. The pavilion is a Dai Buddhist building.

Jingzhen Octagonal Pavilion was listed in the third batch of Major Historical and Cultural Site Protected at the National Level by the Chinese State Council in 1988.

References

Buddhist buildings in China
Buildings and structures in Xishuangbanna Dai Autonomous Prefecture